FK Mogila Bi Milk is a football club based in the village of Mogila near Bitola, Republic of North Macedonia. They were recently played in the Macedonian Third League.

History
The club was founded in 2009.

References

External links
Club info at MacedonianFootball 
Football Federation of Macedonia 

Mogila
Association football clubs established in 2009
2009 establishments in the Republic of Macedonia
FK